The Arkhangelsk FSB office bombing was a suicide bombing that occurred in Arkhangelsk, Russia. On the morning of 31 October 2018, Mikhail Vasilievich Zhlobitsky, a 17-year old tekhnikum student entered the local office of the Russian Federal Security Service (FSB) and pulled a manually controlled Improvised explosive device from under his clothes and detonated it. He died on the spot and the explosion injured three local FSB officers.

Motive 
Minutes before the explosion, a post was submitted to an anarcho-communist themed online chat on Telegram by a user under the alias "Sergey Nechayev" who used the logo of the Red Army Faction as his avatar, stating he was going to bomb the Arkhangelsk FSB office in retaliation against the torture of Russian anarchists and anti-fascists. Mikhail was reported as saying in the chat room, “I’m waiting until I’m 18 years old so I’m responsible for my actions, not my parents. I don’t know what you all are waiting for,”.

See also 
Network (Russia)
2004 Arkhangelsk explosion

References

Anarchism in Russia
Anarcho-communism
Arkhangelsk
Building bombings in Russia
October 2018 events in Russia
Suicide bombings in Russia
Terrorist incidents in Russia in 2018
Far-left terrorism